University Place is a short north-south thoroughfare in Manhattan, New York City, United States, which runs from Washington Square Park in the south as a continuation of Washington Square East, taking the position of Madison Avenue uptown, and terminates at East 14th Street just southwest of Union Square. Although the roadway continues north of 14th Street as Union Square West, traffic on the two streets run in opposite directions (University Place uptown, and Union Square West downtown), both feeding into 14th Street. Until the late 1990s, University Place was a two-way street. The street contains numerous shops and restaurants, many of which cater to students at NYU and The New School.

History
University Place was formerly part of Wooster Street, but received a new name in 1838, a year after New York University's first building opened on Washington Square. The street was the original location of the Union Theological Seminary in 1838, and the New York Society Library moved there in 1856. The Industrial Education Association, precursor to Teachers College, occupied the Union Theological Seminary building in the late 1880s.

See also
 Buegeleisen and Jacobson, musical instrument distributor

References

Greenwich Village
Streets in Manhattan
Union Square, Manhattan